Ezio Acchini (2 January 1922 – 17 January 1985) was an Italian rower. He competed in the 1948 Summer Olympics. Mario Acchini was his cousin.

References

1922 births
1985 deaths
Rowers at the 1948 Summer Olympics
Italian male rowers
Olympic rowers of Italy
European Rowing Championships medalists
20th-century Italian people